Virginia Beach United FC are an American soccer club competing in the USL League Two, that started play in 2019. The team is a joint effort of local youth organizations Beach FC and Virginia Rush. They are owned by Rush Sports, who also back three other USL2 sides - Cedar Stars Rush, Colorado Rush SC, and Daytona Rush SC.

Year-by-year

References

USL League Two teams
2019 establishments in Virginia
Association football clubs established in 2019
Soccer clubs in Virginia
Sports in Virginia Beach, Virginia